"Rifles of the I.R.A."  is an Irish folk song associated with the Irish War of Independence and the Irish Civil War. The song contains several references Irish historical events including the execution of Irish republican Kevin Barry, the Easter Rising and the Burning of Cork.

Recordings
Artists and groups who have recorded the song include:
Dominic Behan, original composer 
The Wolfe Tones, on their 1970 album Rifles of the I.R.A.

References

Irish folk songs
Year of song missing